Henry Bernstein is a British sociologist and Emeritus Professor of Development Studies at the University of London: School of Oriental and African Studies. He has worked for several decades on the political economy of agrarian change, social theory, peasant studies, land reform, and the rural economy in South Africa.

Career

Bernstein spent most of his career in the UK. A Londoner, he studied history at the University of Cambridge and took a Masters in Sociology at the London School of Economics in the late 1960s.

He has taught and researched in Turkey, Tanzania, South Africa, China and the USA, latterly developing an academic career in the UK. He was a research associate at IDS, Sussex University in the late 1960s, a lecturer in interdisciplinary studies at the University of Kent in the early 1970s, Director of the External Programme at Wye College in the 1980s (which focussed on rural development and agricultural teaching, among other topics), and Senior Lecturer in Agricultural and Rural Development, IDPM at the University of Manchester in the early 1990s. He then moved to SOAS as Professor, to develop a Development Studies Department, retiring in 2011. He was Adjunct Professor at China Agricultural University, Beijing.

Research
Bernstein's research spans many areas but focusses on the political economy of agrarian change, as well as social theory, and more recently globalisation and labour. He is well known for theories of agrarian society and its change, identifying with class analysis and Marxist approaches. His work in peasant studies is particularly detailed, expressed in dozens of articles and books.

From 1985-2000 he was co-editor with Professor Terry Byres of the Journal of Peasant Studies, and then became the founding editor, again with Byres, of the Journal of Agrarian Change from 2001-2008. The establishment of the new journal was in reaction to the editorial policy of the JPS. Today, both co-exist.

Selected publications 

Bernstein, Henry (1973) Underdevelopment and Development: Third World Today (Penguin education)

Bernstein, Henry (1992) Rural Livelihoods: Crises and Responses, Oxford University Press

Bernstein, Henry and Brass, Tom (Eds)(1996) Agrarian Questions: Essays in Appreciation of T.J.Byres (Library of Peasant Studies), Routledge

Bernstein, Henry (2000) "The Peasantry" in Global Capitalism: Who, Where and Why. Merlin Press (London), pp. 25–51

Bernstein, Henry (2010) Class Dynamics of Agrarian Change.  Halifax NS: Fernwood

References 

British sociologists
Development specialists
Living people
Year of birth missing (living people)
Academics of Wye College